Joanna Wasick is an American voice actress.

Wasick provided the voice for Princess Farah in the video game Prince of Persia: The Sands of Time. She also played Liberty in the film Magic Rock.

External links
 

American voice actresses
Living people
Year of birth missing (living people)
Place of birth missing (living people)
21st-century American women